Doyle Bramhall (February 17, 1949 – November 12, 2011) was an American blues singer, guitarist and drummer with deep roots in the Austin, Texas music scene.

Career 
Bramhall joined The Chessmen with Jimmie Vaughan while in high school. The group opened for Jimi Hendrix when he played Dallas. In 1969, he moved to Austin and formed Texas Storm with Jimmie Vaughan. In the 1970s, Bramhall formed The Nightcrawlers with Marc Benno, which also included Jimmie Vaughan's younger brother Stevie Ray Vaughan on guitar. While in The Nightcrawlers, Bramhall co-wrote the tune "Dirty Pool," which appeared on Stevie Ray Vaughan's debut album, Texas Flood. He would write or co-write several other songs for the younger Vaughan, such as "Life by the Drop" from SRV's The Sky Is Crying album, and he played the drums on the Vaughan Brothers only album, Family Style.

Bramhall released his debut solo record in 1994, which included appearances from the Vaughans and his own son. He also collaborated with Jennifer Warnes in the 1990s.

He is the father of singer and guitarist Doyle Bramhall II.

Death 
On November 12, 2011, Bramhall died of heart failure while asleep at his home in Alpine, Texas. He was 62. It was reported that Bramhall had been suffering from pneumonia in the days immediately preceding his death.

Discography 
Groovin' with Big D – Kathy & the Kilowatts (Lectro-Fine Records, 1991)
Bird Nest on the Ground (Antone's, 1994)
Fitchburg Street (Yep Roc, 2003) U.S. Billboard Top Blues Albums No. 6
Is It News (Yep Roc, 2007) U.S. Top Blues Albums No. 7

See also 
List of Texas blues musicians
List of electric blues musicians

References

External links 
Life by the Drop – Doyle Bramhall returns to Fitchburg Street

1949 births
2011 deaths
American blues drummers
American blues singer-songwriters
People from Dallas
Texas blues musicians
Singer-songwriters from Texas
People from Alpine, Texas
Yep Roc Records artists
American male singer-songwriters